St. Sebastian's Church, St. Sebastian Church, San Sebastian Church  or St. Sebastian Parish Church may refer to:

Germany 
Church of St. Fabian and St. Sebastian, Sülze, an Evangelical-Lutheran parish church

India 
St. Sebastian Church, Papanasam
St Sebastian's Church, Neyyassery
St. Sebastian's Church, Chemmakkad of the Roman Catholic Diocese of Quilon
St. Sebastian's Syro-Malabar Catholic Church, Udayamperoor
St. Sebastian's Church (Dilshad Garden)
St. Sebastian's Church, Chittattukara

Italy 
San Sebastiano, Palazzolo Acreide, a Baroque church in Palazzolo Acreide, Sicily
San Sebastiano, Verona, a former church in Verona destroyed in World War II

Malta 
Church of St Sebastian, Qormi
Old Church of St Sebastian, Qormi

Philippines 
San Sebastian Church (Manila), Quiapo, Manila
San Sebastian Parish Church (Lumban), Laguna

Spain 
St Sebastian's Church, Madrid

Sri Lanka 
St. Sebastian's Cathedral, Mannar
St. Sebastian's Church, Katuwapitiya
St. Sebastian's Church, Wellaweediya

United States 
St. Sebastian Church (Middletown, Connecticut)
St. Sebastian Roman Catholic Church (Queens), New York City
St. Sebastian's Catholic Church (Sebastian, Ohio)